5-azacytidine-induced protein 1 is a protein that in humans is encoded by the AZI1 gene.

References

External links

Further reading 

 
 
 
 

Centrosome